Sardar Talib Hassan Nakai is a Pakistani politician who has been a member of the National Assembly of Pakistan since August 2018. He was previously a member of the National Assembly from January 2003 to 2013. He studied at Aitchison College and Forman Christian College.

Political career
Nakai was elected to the National Assembly as a candidate of PML-J from constituency NA-108 in Pakistani general election 1993. Nakai was elected to the National Assembly of Pakistan from Constituency NA-142 (Kasur-V) as a candidate of Pakistan Muslim League (Q) (PML-Q) in by-polls held in January 2003. He received 48,935 votes and defeated Rana Muhammad Hayat.

He was re-elected to the National Assembly from Constituency NA-142 (Kasur-V) as a candidate of PML-Q in 2008 Pakistani general election. He received 47,192 votes and defeated Rana Muhammad Hayat.

He ran for the National Assembly seat from Constituency NA-142 (Kasur-V) as a candidate of PML-Q in 2013 Pakistani general election. He received 65,758 votes, losing to Rana Muhammad Hayat.

He was re-elected to the National Assembly as a candidate of Pakistan Tehreek-e-Insaf (PTI) from Constituency NA-140 (Kasur-IV) in 2018 Pakistani general election and defeated Rana Muhammad Hayat.

References

External Link

More Reading
 List of members of the 15th National Assembly of Pakistan

Living people
Pakistani MNAs 2008–2013
Pakistani MNAs 2002–2007
Pakistani MNAs 2018–2023
Year of birth missing (living people)